Ranularia cynocephala is a species of predatory sea snail, a marine gastropod mollusk in the family Cymatiidae.

Description 
The maximum recorded shell length is 84 mm.

Habitat and distribution 
The minimum recorded depth for this species is 0 m; the maximum recorded depth is 137 m.

References

Cymatiidae
Gastropods described in 1816